Grete Daut (born 4 January 2000) is an Estonian footballer who plays as a midfielder for Saku Sporting and the Estonia women's national team.

Career
She made her debut for the Estonia national team on 12 August 2020 against Latvia, coming on as a substitute for Mari-Liis Lillemäe.

References

2000 births
Living people
Women's association football midfielders
Estonian women's footballers
Estonia women's international footballers
Footballers from Tallinn